Glia is a Monthly peer reviewed scientific journal covering research on the structure and function of neuroglia. It was established in 1988 and is published by John Wiley & Sons. The founding and current editors-in-chief are Bruce R. Ransom (University of Washington School of Medicine) and Helmut Kettenmann (Max Delbrück Center for Molecular Medicine).

Abstracting and indexing 
The journal is abstracted and indexed in:

According to the Journal Citation Reports, the journal has a 2020 impact factor of 7.452.

References

External links 
 

Wiley (publisher) academic journals
Publications established in 1988
Monthly journals
Neuroscience journals
English-language journals